Iia is a village in Põhja-Sakala Parish, Viljandi County in Estonia. As of 2011 Census, the settlement's population was 23.

The northern half of the village's territory is covered by the Ördi Bog, which is located in the Soomaa National Park.

Gallery

References

Villages in Viljandi County